Andi Gladwin (May 10, 1983) is a British magician, speaker, and publisher. He has appeared on television (ITV's Next Great Magician, Penn & Teller: Fool Us, The Big Breakfast, Lance Burton's Young Magician Showcase, Masters of Illusion, and more), has lectured for magicians throughout the UK, US, and Europe and written/published books on magic. Gladwin is a Member of the Inner Magic Circle with Gold Star and was granted the Maskelyne Literary Award from the prestigious club.

Biography
Gladwin was born and raised in Newent, Gloucestershire. When he was 10, he saw a number of stage illusionists while on holiday. His interest in magic blossomed and he began to perform regularly from age 15. After working in IT for almost ten years, he became a professional close-up magician in January 2010.

Gladwin's TV engagements include performances on BBC1, BBC2, ITV1, Channel 4 (The Big Breakfast), The Young Magician's Showcase, Penn & Teller: Fool Us, and multiple seasons of Masters of Illusion.

Since 2006, Gladwin has organized a conference for magicians called The Session. In 2012 he also started organizing Magifest, one of America's oldest magic conventions.

In 2009, Gladwin started a new publishing venture with well-known magician Joshua Jay called Vanishing Inc. Magic. The company has blossomed into one of the largest magic retailers known worldwide.

In 2010, Gladwin released his work on the Double Lift and Second Deal called The Master Pushoff. These two DVD sets received rave reviews, such as "I sincerely hope it will serve as a model for other magicians who turn to DVD as a teaching medium; it's miles ahead of the pack in many important ways." — Gordon Meyer  and "Acquiring this skill will take work and practice, but the result is worth it. It will open up a new world of possibilities, and the DVD set is highly recommended. " —Matthew Field, The Magic Circular Magazine 

Between 2014 - 2016, Gladwin was the "Magicana" columnist in Genii Magazine.

Perhaps Andi's most well-known trick is to perform a magic trick from inside of a large red balloon, apparently only using his head. In 2016 Andi was a featured performer on ITV1's The Next Great Magician where this trick was featured. He also performed it on Penn & Teller: Fool Us; his performance from that show was featured in The New York Times.

TV Appearances

 The Big Breakfast
 Fox Network's Lance Burton's Young Magician's Showcase
 Next Great Magician
 Penn & Teller: Fool Us
 Masters of Illusion

Awards
 The John Nevil Maskelyne Prize (2012)

Published works
While Andi has published many books through his Vanishing Inc. Magic brand, he has authored the following:
 The Magician's Ltd Cookbook (2007)
 Movers & Shakers (with Tyler Wilson) (2007)
 Jack Parker's 52 Memories (2008)
 The Definitive Sankey (Volumes 1 - 3, with Joshua Jay, 2013)
 Blomberg Laboratories (2015)
 52 Memories (retrospective edition, 2016)
 Going Pro (2017)
 Dynamo: Book Of Secrets (2017) with Dynamo and Joshua Jay
 The Card Magic of Edward G. Brown (2018)
 Pure Imagination (2019)
 The Boy Who Cried Magic (2020)

References

1983 births
Living people
People from Newent
English magicians